The 1905 European Rowing Championships were rowing championships held on 27 August on the Ghent–Terneuzen Canal in the Belgian city of Ghent.

Medal summary

Footnotes

References

European Rowing Championships
European Rowing Championships
Rowing
Rowing
European Rowing Championships
Sport in Ghent